Santa Tereza de Goias is a municipality in north Goiás state, Brazil.  Santa Tereza de Goiás is often spelled "Santa Teresa de Goiás".

Location
Santa Tereza is located in the extreme north of the state 35 km. south of Porangatu.  It is on the important BR-153 highway.
Highway connections starting in Goiânia are made by GO-080 / Nerópolis / São Francisco de Goiás / BR-153 / Jaraguá / GO-080 / Goianésia / Barro Alto / GO-342 / BR-080 / BR-153 / Uruaçu / Campinorte.

Santa Tereza de Goiás is surrounded by the following municipalities: 
north:  Porangatu and Trombas
south:  Campinorte and Formoso
east:  Minaçu 
west:  Mutunópolis

Political and Demographic Information
The mayor was Paulo Vieira da Costa (January 2005) and there were 9 members on the city council.  The number of eligible voters was 3,238 (December/2007).  The population density was 5,22 inhabitants/km2 (2007).  The urban population was 3,475  and the rural population was 670 (2007).
Population growth:  -2,03% 1996/2007

Economic Information
The economy is based on subsistence agriculture, cattle raising, services, public administration, and small transformation industries.  
Industrial units: 1 (2007)
Commercial units: 53 (2007)
Automobiles: 293  (2007)
Farms: 243 (2006)
Permanent and Temporary Planted Area: 963 hectares
Natural Pasture: 36,632 hectares
Woodland and Forest: 15,847 hectares
Workers related to the farm owner: 367
Workers not related to the farm owner: 161  (IBGE)
Cattle herd: 58,000 head (2006)
Main crops: rice (700 hectares), bananas, beans, manioc, corn (600 hectares), and soybeans.

Quality of Life
In 2006 there were 6 schools and 1 hospital with 17 beds.  The adult literacy rate was 84.7% (2000) (national average was 86.4%) and  the infant mortality rate was 31.85 (2000) (national average was 33).

All data are from IBGE
 
Municipal Human Development Index:  0.729 (2000)
State ranking:  150 (out of 242 municipalities)
National ranking:  2,460 (out of 5,507 municipalities)

Seplan Economic Development Index
The ranking was 192 out of 246 municipalities

Seplan Social Development Index
The ranking was 183 out of 246 municipalities

See also
List of municipalities in Goiás
Microregions of Goiás

References

Frigoletto

Municipalities in Goiás